Girvan Football Club are a Scottish football club based in the town of Girvan, South Ayrshire. Nicknamed the Seasiders, they were formed in 1947 and play at Hamilton Park.

Prior to the 2004–05 season, Girvan played in the South of Scotland Football League and as full members of the Scottish Football Association, entered the Scottish Qualifying Cup each year. When the club joined the Scottish Junior Football Association in 2004, they were allowed to continue this arrangement and since Scottish Cup re-organisation in 2007, now qualify directly for the tournament every season. This situation was unique to Girvan until 2014 when fellow Junior clubs Banks O' Dee and Linlithgow Rose also achieved full SFA member status via club licensing.

On 26 June 2018, Ian Patterson became the manager at Girvan, Joining him at the helm is former Craigmark assistant and fellow ex-Girvan player Greg Gallagher and John ‘Hoots’ Harvey.

On 26 January 2020, Ian Patterson was sacked as manager at Girvan, with Peter Leonard (footballer) as caretaker manager until the end of season.

On 29 April 2021, Girvan FC announced a new management team of Matt Maley, Robert Love, Andy McInnes & Jack Martin. Taking the reigns from caretaker manager Peter Leonard.

Current squad

(Vice-Captain)

Management team and coaching staff

Honours 
South of Scotland Football League

 Winners: 1989–90

South of Scotland League Cup: 1975–76, 1977–78, 1991–92, 2001–02

External links 
 
 Facebook
 Twitter

References

Football clubs in Scotland
Scottish Junior Football Association clubs
Football in South Ayrshire
Association football clubs established in 1947
1947 establishments in Scotland
South of Scotland Football League teams
West of Scotland Football League teams
Girvan